Ramakrushna Gouda was a Politician in Odisha. He has been served as the Member of Legislative Assembly for Bhanjanagar from the year 1990–1995.

References

1932 births
2010 deaths
Odisha politicians
Janata Dal politicians